The Journal of Pediatric Gastroenterology and Nutrition is a monthly peer-reviewed medical journal covering research on digestive diseases and nutrition in children. It is published by  Lippincott Williams & Wilkins and was established in 1982. It is an official journal of the European Society for Paediatric Gastroenterology, Hepatology and Nutrition and the North American Society for Pediatric Gastroenterology, Hepatology and Nutrition. The journal provides a forum for original papers and reviews dealing with pediatric gastroenterology and nutrition, including normal and abnormal functions of the alimentary tract and its associated organs, including the salivary glands, pancreas, gallbladder, and liver. Particular emphasis is on development and its relation to infant and childhood nutrition.

References

External links
 

Publications established in 1982
Pediatrics journals
Gastroenterology and hepatology journals
Lippincott Williams & Wilkins academic journals
Monthly journals
English-language journals